The Cardiff Built-up Area or Cardiff Urban Area is the name given to the urban area around Cardiff. The vast bulk of the population and area are contributed by Cardiff, which had a population of 335,145 at the 2011 census. The rest was made up by the towns of Penarth and Dinas Powys, connected to the south-west of the city along Cardiff Bay; as well as the South Wales Valleys towns of Caerphilly and Pontypridd. The total official population of this urban area was given to be 447,487 in 2011. This was an increase of almost 37% on the 2001 population of 327,706. This was mainly due to Caerphilly and Pontypridd becoming part of the built-up area. The population of the Cardiff unitary authority (not co-terminous with the built-up area or the wider urban area) in 2001 was 305,353. Cardiff Council estimated the population of the unitary authority at 317,500 in 2006; at the 2011 census it was 346,090.

Subdivisions
According to the ONS definition the Cardiff Urban Area had the following subdivisions:

Notes:
 Radyr was included in the Cardiff subdivision in the 2011 census.
 Pontypridd, Caerphilly and Taff's Well were separate urban areas in the 2001 census.

References

Demographics of Wales
Urban areas of Wales